Trapania benni is a species of sea slug, a dorid nudibranch, a marine gastropod mollusc in the family Goniodorididae.

Distribution
This species was described from New South Wales, Australia. It has also been reported from Victoria, Rapid Bay, South Australia and Fremantle, Western Australia.

Description
This goniodorid nudibranch is translucent white with a meshwork pattern of pale brown forming irregular patches on the body. There are round yellow spots on the head, behind the rhinophores, behind the gills and on the rhinophores and gills, all within the white areas.

Ecology
Trapania benni probably feeds on Entoprocta, which often grow on sponges and other living substrata.

References

  Burn R. (2006) A checklist and bibliography of the Opisthobranchia (Mollusca: Gastropoda) of Victoria and the Bass Strait area, south-eastern Australia. Museum Victoria Science Reports 10:1–42

Goniodorididae
Gastropods described in 1987